is a railway station on the JR Hokkaido Sekishō Line. It is located in Shimukappu, Hokkaidō, Japan. The station code is K21.

Station structure
 2-way, 3-track, above-ground station.
 Platforms

 Shimukappu is a simple consignment station, administered by Shin-Yūbari Station. Ordinary tickets, express tickets, and reserved-seat tickets for all JR lines are on sale.
 Business hours: 7:25 a.m. - 3:25 p.m.

Adjacent stations
Hokkaido Railway Company
Sekishō Line
Shin-Yūbari Station - ( Kaede Signal Ground ) - ( Osawa Signal Ground ) - ( Higashi-Osawa Signal Ground ) - ( Seifūzan Signal Ground ) - ( Oni-Tōge Signal Ground ) - Shimukappu Station - ( Higashi-Shimukappu Signal Ground ) - ( Takinosawa Signal Ground ) - ( Horoka Signal Ground ) - Tomamu Station

References

Shimukappu Station
Railway stations in Japan opened in 1981